Scopula arenosaria  is a moth of the family Geometridae. It was described by Staudinger in 1879. It is found in south-eastern Russia.

References

Moths described in 1879
arenosaria
Endemic fauna of Russia
Moths of Asia
Taxa named by Otto Staudinger